The women's trap shooting event at the 2011 Pan American Games was on October 18 at the Jalisco Hunting Club in Guadalajara. The defending Pan American Games champion is Susan Nattrass of Canada.

The event consisted of two rounds: a qualifier and a final. In the qualifier, each shooter fired 3 sets of 25 targets in trap shooting, with 10 targets being thrown to the left, 10 to the right, and 5 straight-away in each set. The shooters could take two shots at each target.

The top 6 shooters in the qualifying round moved on to the final round. There, they fired one additional round of 25 targets, where only one shot could be taken at each target. The total score from all 100 targets was used to determine final ranking. Ties are broken using a shoot-off; additional shots are fired one at a time until there is no longer a tie.

Schedule
All times are Central Standard Time (UTC-6).

Records
The existing world and Pan American Games records were as follows.

Results
11 athletes from 6 countries competed.

Qualification

Final

References

Shooting at the 2011 Pan American Games
Pan